Gololobovo is a rural locality (a village) in Zaraysky District of Moscow Oblast, Russia, located  east of Zaraysk, the administrative center of the district. The village is the administrative center of Gololobovkoye Rural Settlement of Zaraysky District.

References

Rural localities in Zaraysky District, Moscow Oblast